List of Mesolithic and Epipaleolithic settlements.

Mesolithic Europe

Epipaleolithic Near East

See also
 List of Neolithic settlements

References

Mesolithic